Edward Sorley (1871 – 16 October 1933) was a British actor.

Sorley was born in Camberwell, Surrey and died at age 62 in Blackheath, London.

Selected filmography
 Queen's Evidence (1919)
 The Temptress (1920)
 The Sword of Damocles (1920)
 The Night Hawk (1921)
 Mord Em'ly (1922)
 The Loves of Mary, Queen of Scots (1923)
 Bulldog Drummond's Third Round (1925)
 Nell Gwyn (1926)
 Dawn (1928)

References

External links

1871 births
1933 deaths
English male stage actors
English male film actors
English male silent film actors
People from Camberwell
19th-century English male actors
20th-century English male actors